Cape Alexander (also  Uvdlerssuak and Sarfalik) is a headland in the Baffin Bay, northwest Greenland, Avannaata municipality. It is one of the important landmarks of Greenland.

Geography
Cape Alexander is located in Prudhoe Land, at the western end of Hartstene Bay with the Dodge Glacier to the east and the Storm Glacier to the southeast. This headland is the westernmost point of the island of Greenland.  

The small Carey Islands are located further to the west; among them Nordvestø (73°10'W), the westernmost point of Greenland as a territory.

See also
List of countries by westernmost point

References

Alexander